The 2009–10 Premier Soccer League season (known as the ABSA Premiership for sponsorship reasons) was the fourteenth since its establishment. Supersport United were the defending champions, having won their second premier league title in the 2008–09 season. The campaign began in August 2009, and ended in March 2010. A total of 16 teams competed in the league. SuperSport United were crowned champions for the third successive time two matches before the end despite losing to Bidvest Wits (1–2) in the last match.

Clubs
Ajax Cape Town
AmaZulu
Bidvest Wits
Bloemfontein Celtic
Free State Stars
Golden Arrows
Jomo Cosmos
Kaizer Chiefs
Mamelodi Sundowns
Maritzburg United
Moroka Swallows
Mpumalanga Black Aces
Orlando Pirates
Platinum Stars
Santos
Supersport United

Promotion and relegation

Pre-Season

 Champions of the Inland Stream Jomo Cosmos took on Champions of the Coastal Stream Carara Kicks in a two leg playoff for promotion to the Premier Division.
 The first leg of the play-off saw the match end in a goalless draw at the Charles Mopeli Stadium on the 7 May 2009.
 The second leg of the play-off saw Jomo Cosmos win Carara Kicks 2 – 1 at Vaal Technikon on the 10 May 2009 to see Jomo Cosmos promoted to the Premier Division.
 Thanda Royal Zulu who finished 15th on the Premier Division table will go into a mini play-off tournament with Carara Kicks (who lost their play-off match with Jomo Cosmos), Mpumalanga Black Aces (who finished second in the Inland Stream) and F.C. Cape Town (who finished second in the Coastal Sream).
 Carara Kicks will face Mpumalanga Black Aces and Thanda Royal Zulu will face F.C. Cape Town
Teams promoted from 2008 to 2009 National First Division
 Champions (Inland Stream) Jomo Cosmos
 Play-offs: Mpumalanga Black Aces

Teams relegated to 2009–10 National First Division
 Last on PSL:  Bay United
 Play-offs: Thanda Royal Zulu

Post-Season

Teams promoted from 2009 to 2010 National First Division
 Champions  Vasco Da Gama
 Play-offs: None Mpumalanga Black Aces F.C. retained their PSL status by winning the play-offs

Teams relegated to 2010–11 National First Division
 Last on PSL:  Jomo Cosmos
 Play-offs: None Mpumalanga Black Aces F.C. retained their PSL status by winning the play-offs

League table

Fixtures and results

Top goalscorers
As of March 28, 2010

17 goals
  Katlego Mphela (Mamelodi Sundowns)

13 goals
  Prince Olomu (Bloemfontein Celtic)

11 goals
  Calvin Kadi (Bidvest Wits)

10 goals
  Daine Klate (SuperSport United)
  Ayanda Dlamini (AmaZulu)

8 goals
  Richard Henyekane (Golden Arrows)
  Erwin Isaacs (Santos ) 
  Phikolethu Spelman (Santos)

7 goals
  Clifford Mulenga (Mpumalanga Black Aces)
  Mark Haskins (Bidvest Wits ) 
  Anthony Laffor (SuperSport United)

6 goals
  Morgan Gould (SuperSport United)
  Siyabonga Nomvethe (Moroka Swallows ) 
  Glen Salmon (SuperSport United)
  Toni Nhleko (Kaizer Chiefs)
  Dipsy Selolwane (Ajax Cape Town ) 
  Siphiwe Tshabalala ''(SuperSport United)
;

PSL managers

Kits 2009–2010

See also
 List of South African football transfers 2009–10

References

External links
Premier Soccer League (PSL) Official Website
RSSSF competition overview

2009-10
2009–10 in African association football leagues
1